Lee Jung-Woon (born May 5, 1980) is a South Korean football player who plays for Gangneung City on loan from Gangwon FC in the K-League.

Football career

Early career
He was born in Samcheok, Gangwon and grew up in Gangwon until adulthood. Lee attended Sungkyunkwan University in Seoul from 1999 to 2002. He lifted trophy as Most Valuable Player in the 2000 Autumn College League Tournament (Hangul: 2000년 전국추계대학축구연맹전).

K-League
After graduating from university, he joined K-League side Chunnam Dragons. Lee recorded 5 goals in 25 league games for three years. As 2005 season was ended, he became a free agent. He made trials in La Liga side Deportivo Alavés but it was failed and he returned to South Korea in 2006 summer.

Korea National League
When he returned to South Korea, K-League's registration deadline was ended. So he joined Korea National League side Gangneung City FC in his homeland. After three years in Gangneung, he left team to do military service for two years.

Return to K-League
In July 2010, as soon as his military service ended, he made tryout with Gangwon FC. On July 12, 2010, he joined Gangwon FC. On 24 July 2010, he made his first match in Gangwon against Jeonbuk in Gangneung by substitute. He moved back to Gangneung City FC after the 2010 season.

On 4 July 2011, he moved to Gangwon FC.

Club career statistics

References

External links 
 

1980 births
Living people
Association football midfielders
South Korean footballers
Jeonnam Dragons players
Gangwon FC players
K League 1 players
Korea National League players
People from Samcheok
Sportspeople from Gangwon Province, South Korea